The Kingdom of Saxony, lasting from 1806 to 1918, was an independent member of a number of historical confederacies in Napoleonic through post-Napoleonic Germany. The kingdom was formed from the Electorate of Saxony. From 1871, it was part of the German Empire. It became a free state in the era of Weimar Republic in 1918 after the end of World War I and the  abdication of King Frederick Augustus III of Saxony. Its capital was the city of Dresden, and its modern successor state is the Free State of Saxony.

History

Napoleonic era and the German Confederation

Before 1806, Saxony was part of the Holy Roman Empire, a thousand-year-old entity that had become highly decentralised over the centuries. The rulers of the Electorate of Saxony of the House of Wettin had held the title of elector for several centuries. When the Holy Roman Empire was dissolved in August 1806 following the defeat of Emperor Francis II by Napoleon at the Battle of Austerlitz, the electorate was raised to the status of an independent kingdom with the support of the First French Empire, then the dominant power in Central Europe. The last elector of Saxony became King Frederick Augustus I.

Following the defeat of Saxony's ally Prussia at the Battle of Jena in 1806, Saxony joined the Confederation of the Rhine, and remained within the Confederation until its dissolution in 1813 with Napoleon's defeat at the Battle of Leipzig. Following the battle, in which Saxony – virtually alone of all the German states – had fought alongside the French, King Frederick Augustus I was deserted by his troops, taken prisoner by the Prussians, and considered to have forfeited his throne by the allies, who put Saxony under Prussian occupation and administration. This was probably more due to the Prussian desire to annex Saxony than to any crime on Frederick Augustus' part, and the fate of Saxony would prove to be one of the main issues at the Congress of Vienna. In the end, 40% of the Kingdom, including the historically significant Wittenberg, home of the Protestant Reformation, was annexed by Prussia, but Frederick Augustus was restored to the throne in the remainder of his kingdom, which still included the major cities of Dresden and Leipzig. The Kingdom also joined the German Confederation, the new organization of the German states to replace the fallen Holy Roman Empire.

Austro-Prussian War and the German Empire

During the 1866 Austro-Prussian War, Saxony sided with Austria, and the Royal Saxon army was generally seen as the only ally to bring substantial aid to the Austrian cause, having abandoned the defense of Saxony itself to join up with the Austrian army in Bohemia. This effectiveness probably allowed Saxony to escape the fate of other north German states allied with Austria – notably the Kingdom of Hanover – which were annexed by Prussia after the war. The Austrians and French insisted as a point of honour that Saxony must be spared, and the Prussians acquiesced. Saxony nevertheless joined the Prussian-led North German Confederation the next year. With Prussia's victory over France in the Franco-Prussian War of 1871, the members of the Confederation were organised by Otto von Bismarck into the German Empire, with William I as its emperor. John, as Saxony's incumbent king, had to accept the Emperor as primus inter pares, although he, like the other German princes, retained some of the prerogatives of a sovereign ruler, including the ability to enter into diplomatic relations with other states.

End of the kingdom

Wilhelm I's grandson Kaiser Wilhelm II abdicated in 1918 as a result of a revolution set off in the days before Germany's defeat in World War I. King Frederick Augustus III of Saxony followed him into abdication and with an attempt to establish the Soviet Republic of Saxony, which formed around the cities of Dresden and Leipzig. The revolution would eventually and swiftly get put down by the Freikorps. Within the newly formed Weimar Republic, on November 1, 1920, the Kingdom of Saxony would be reorganized into the Free State of Saxony

Governance

1831 Constitution
The 1831 Constitution of Saxony established the state as a parliamentary monarchy.

King
The king was named as head of the nation.  He was required to follow the provisions of the constitution, and could not become the ruler of any other state (save by blood inheritance) without the consent of the Diet, or parliament.  The crown was hereditary in the male line of the royal family through agnatic primogeniture, though provisions existed allowing a female line to inherit in the absence of qualified male heirs. Added provisions concerned the formation of a regency if the king was too young or otherwise unable to rule, as well as provisions concerning the crown prince's education.

Any acts or decrees signed or issued by the king had to be countersigned by at least one of his ministers, who thus took responsibility for them.  Without the ministerial countersignature, no act of the king was to be considered valid.  The king was given the right to declare any accused person innocent, or alternately to mitigate or suspend their punishment or pardon them (but not to increase penalties); such decrees did not require ministerial co-signature.  He was also given supreme power over religious matters in Saxony.  He appointed the president of the upper house of the Diet, together with a proxy from among three candidates suggested by that house, and appointed the president and proxy of the lower house, as well. (See below.)

The king was given sole power to promulgate laws, and to carry them into effect, and only by his consent could any proposal for a law be advanced in the Diet.  He equally had authority to issue emergency decrees and even to issue non-emergency laws that he found needful or "advantageous", though such instruments required the counter-signature of at least one of his ministers, and had to be presented to the next Diet for approval. He could not, however, change the constitution itself or the electoral laws in this manner. He was permitted to veto laws passed by the Diet (though he was required to give his reasons for so doing, in each instance), or to send them back with proposed amendments for reconsideration. He was permitted to issue extraordinary decrees to obtain money for state expenditures refused by the Diet, through the Supreme Court, though such decrees could only last for one year. He was permitted to dissolve the Diet, though new elections for the lower house had to be held within six months; he was also permitted to convoke extraordinary sessions of the legislature at his discretion.

From 1697 the Electors of Saxony became Catholic in order to accept the crowns of Poland and Lithuania, of which they were kings until 1763. The royal family remained Roman Catholic, ruling over a domain that was 95% Protestant.

Ministry
The ministry was defined in the constitution as consisting of six departments, all of which were made responsible to the Diet:

The Chief Court of Justice;
The Court of Finance;
The Office For the Affairs of the Interior;
The War Office;
The Ecclesiastical Court;
The Office of Foreign Affairs.

Members of the ministry had the right to appear in either chamber of the Diet at will, and there to participate in debate, but upon a division of the house they had to withdraw.

Bill of Rights
A Bill of Rights was included in the constitution. It incorporated:

Protections for "liberty of person and right over his own property is without limit except that which law and justice dictates" (Section 27); 
The right of a citizen to choose any lawful profession and to emigrate so long as no military or civil obligations attached to them (Sections 28–29); 
The right to be paid for expropriated property and to challenge the amount of payment set by the state in court (Section 31); 
Liberty of conscience and religion (Section 32), though freedom of religion was limited to Christian churches recognized by the state (Section 56); 
Equality for members of state-recognized religious organizations (Section 33); 
Equality in eligibility for government employment (Section 34); 
A limited freedom of the press, subject to legal restrictions (Section 35);
The right to appeal actions of government officials either to the courts or to the Diet itself (Section 36);
The right to directly appeal grievances to the King himself (Section 36);
Freedom from arbitrary arrest and punishment save through conviction in a court of law (Section 51);
No person was to be confined for more than 24 hours without being informed of the reason for his arrest (Section 51);
The right to be free of all taxes other than those prescribed by law or title (Section 37).

Legislature
The Diet, or legislature was divided into two houses, which were constitutionally equal in their rights and status, and neither house was to meet without the other.

The upper chamber consisted of the following:

All princes of the blood who were of legal age (defined as 19, in the constitution);
One deputy of the Archbishopric of Misnia;
The proprietor of the Principality of Wildenfels;
One deputy representing the five Schönburg family domains;
One deputy from the University of Leipzig, chosen by the professors of that institution;
The proprietor of the Barony of Königsbrück;
The proprietor of the Barony of Riebersdorf;
The minister of the Lutheran court chapel;
The deacon of the Cathedral of St. Peter in Budessen;
The superintendent of the town of Leipzig;
One deputy from the Lutheran Cathedral of Wurzen;
One deputy representing four other Schönburg family estates;
Twelve proprietors of manorial estates in the kingdom, possessed of a minimum income of at least $2000 per year from rentals, chosen for life from amongst themselves;
Ten more persons of the proprietary class, possessed of a minimum income of at least $4000 per year from rentals, chosen by the king for life;
The chief magistrate of Dresden and Leipzig;
Six other town magistrates chosen by the king, with the provision that the monarch should try to see that all sections of the kingdom were represented.

Members of this house held their seats so long as they remained qualified to do so under the constitution, or in certain cases until they had reached the age of sixty or participated in three sessions of the Diet.

The lower house of the Diet consisted of:

Twenty proprietors of manorial estates, possessed of rental income of at least $600 per year;
Twenty-five deputies from towns;
Twenty-five deputies chosen from among the peasants;
Five representatives of trades and factories.

A proxy was to also be chosen for each representative, who would take the representative's place, should they be incapacitated, absent, resign or be removed. Each representative was elected for nine years; however, approximately one-third were required to resign their seats every three years (the exact figures were set in the constitution, and determined by lot at the commencement of the first session of the Diet), though all were eligible for immediate re-election. The lower house was to nominate four members, of whom the king was to choose one to be president of that house, and another to be his proxy.

Members of the Diet must be at least 30 years of age; electors must be 25 years of age, not have been convicted of any offense in a court of law, not have their personal estate financially encumbered in any way, and not be under guardianship.

The Diet was required to consider any business laid before it by the king, before proceeding to any other business. Members were to vote their consciences, and were not to accept instructions from their constituents. Members were granted full freedom of speech in the chambers, but were not permitted to insult each other, the king, any member of the royal family, or the parliament. Members who violated any of these rules could be disciplined by their respective house, up to and including permanent expulsion with ineligibility for re-election. The Diet could propose the formation of new laws or changes in existing ones, but no bill could be brought forward without the king's express consent. Conversely, no new law could be enacted, without the Diet's consent.

Bills could be passed by a simple one-third-plus-one vote in both houses of the Diet; a majority vote was not necessary in either house. Any bill rejected or amended must contain a statement of why it was rejected or amended. No new taxes could be imposed without the Diet's consent, though the king was permitted to bypass this in certain instances. The parliament could impeach members of the ministry by unanimous vote of both houses; ministers so impeached were to be tried by a special court; the decision of this court was final, and even the king's right of pardon did not extend to persons convicted by it.

In the wake of the tumultuous 1848 revolutions, Saxony's Landtag extended voting rights (though still maintaining property requirements) and abolished voting taxes. In 1871, Saxony was incorporated into the German Empire and more voting rights were gradually extended. By the early 1900s, Saxony's local politics had settled into a niche in which Social Democrats, Conservatives, and National Liberals were splitting the share of votes and Landtag seats three ways. (In 1909: Social Democrats won 27% of seats, Conservatives won 31% of seats, National Liberals won 31% of seats). Voter participation was high (82% in 1909).

Judiciary
The judiciary was made independent of the civil government. The High Court of Judiciature, created in Sections 142 to 150, was also given authority to rule upon "dubious" points in the constitution; its decision was decreed to be final, and was protected from royal interference.

Administrative reorganisation

Following the adoption of the 1831 constitution, by the Order of April 6, 1835 District Directorates (Kreisdirektionen) were established. These were subsequently known as Kreishauptmannschafts. Originally there were four:
 Kreishauptmannschaft Bautzen
 Kreishauptmannschaft Dresden
 Kreishauptmannschaft Leipzig
 Kreishauptmannschaft Zwickau
In 1900 a fifth was added:
 Kreishauptmannschaft Chemnitz

Reichstag deputies 1867 to 1918

Following the North German Confederation Treaty the Kingdom of Saxony entered the North German Confederation in 1866. As a consequence, the Kingdom returned Deputies to the Reichstag. After the founding of the German Empire on 18 January 1871, the deputies were returned to the Reichstag of the German Empire. Following this Saxony participated in Reichstag elections from February 1867. Zittau returned a series of Reichstag Deputies until 1919 when the existing constituencies were scrapped.

See also
Order of the Rue Crown
 Coinage of Saxony
 Royal Saxon Army

References

External links 

Constitution of the Kingdom of Saxony (in German)
Constitution of the Kingdom of Saxony (in English)

 
Kingdom of Saxony
Kingdom of Saxony
Kingdom of Saxony
Former kingdoms
Former countries in Europe
Kingdom of Saxony
States of the German Confederation
States of the German Empire
Kingdom of Saxony
Kingdom of Saxony
Kingdom of Saxony
Kingdom of Saxony
Kingdom of Saxony
Kingdom of Saxony
Kingdom of Saxony
Kingdom of Saxony
Kingdom of Saxony
States of the North German Confederation
Saxony